Court appointments are the traditional positions within a royal, ducal, or noble household.  In the early Middle Ages, when such households were established, most court officials had either domestic or military duties; the monarch's closest advisers were those who served in the household.  However, as time went by, most of these positions became hereditary, and their role in the running of the household was gradually eroded.  In England, for instance, the Lord Great Chamberlain and the Earl Marshal were originally responsible for the running of the royal household and the royal stables respectively; however, from the late medieval period onwards, their roles became largely honorary, their places in the household being taken by the Lord Chamberlain and the Master of the Horse.

Today, many court titles survive in those European nations that retain royal courts. Examples of court appointments would include:

References 

Royalty